White ethnic is a term used to refer to white Americans who are not Old Stock or White Anglo-Saxon Protestant. They consist of a number of distinct groups and make up approximately 69.4% of the white population in the United States. The term usually refers to the descendants of immigrants from Southern, Central and Eastern Europe, Ireland, the Caucasus and France/Francophone Canada.

History
In the 19th century, American industrial development caused millions of immigrants to emigrate from Europe to the United States. Many came to provide labor for the industrial growth of the Northeast and Midwest, and multitudes of immigrants from non British or non-Germanic Protestant backgrounds settled in the nation's growing cities. This immigration wave continued until 1924 when Congress enacted the Johnson–Reed Act, which restricted immigration as a whole and from southern and eastern European countries in particular. Additionally, the onset of the Great Depression in the 1930s acted as a deterrent to further immigration to the United States from Europe.

Separated from the ruling class by blood, religion and economic circumstances, white ethnics retained a strong and distinct sense of identity from the majority culture. During the early 20th century, many white ethnics were relegated to menial or unskilled labor. They were often subject to ethnic discrimination and xenophobia and were lampooned with stereotypes. Historian and reformer Andrew Dickson White lamented that, in American cities, "a crowd of illiterate peasants, freshly raked from Irish bogs, or Bohemian mines, or Italian robber nests, may exercise virtual control." Religion was another big factor in this alienation from broader American society. In contrast to the mostly Protestant  and Anglo-Saxon majority, white ethnics tended to practice Catholicism, Eastern Orthodox Christianity, or Judaism. These ethnic, cultural and religious differences helped them retain a strong and separate identity from the rest of America until the post war era.

In the 1950s and 1960s, suburbanization caused many young ethnics, many of whom were veterans, to leave the city and settle in the nation's burgeoning suburbs with the hope of rising into a higher economic class. In the 1960s and 1970s, several ethnic organizations became vocal in promoting white ethnic culture and interests. At the same time, white ethnics became more involved in American political life at a national level and began to challenge the majority Protestant ruling class for greater political power.

The election of John F. Kennedy as President in 1960 was the first time that a white ethnic (Irish Catholic) was elected president. However, it was not the first time that a white ethnic was nominated for the presidency. Al Smith, a Catholic, was the first white ethnic to be nominated for president on a major party ticket. Barry Goldwater, an Episcopalian, was the first major party presidential candidate of Jewish heritage. Joe Lieberman was the first Jew to be nominated for vice-president on a major party ticket. If elected, Michael Dukakis would have been the first Greek-American and first Eastern Orthodox Christian president. Spiro Agnew, a Greek-American, was the first white ethnic elected vice president. Joe Biden was the first non-Protestant and the first Roman Catholic elected vice president. Aside from Biden, there have been six Catholic white ethnic vice presidential candidates: William Miller (R-1964), Ed Muskie (D-1968), Thomas Eagleton (D-1972, briefly), Sargent Shriver (D-1972), Geraldine Ferraro (D-1984), and Paul Ryan (R-2012). Mike Pence was raised in a Roman Catholic family of partial Irish descent but has since converted to Evangelical Protestantism. Nancy Pelosi was the first Italian-American to become Speaker of the House, while  Kevin McCarthy is the first Italian-American Republican to become Speaker. McCarthy is also of Irish descent from his father.

Urban politics
White ethnic ward heelers dominated the Democratic political machines of America's major cities throughout the first half of the 20th century. The ward heelers were often Irish Catholics in close alliance with those of other ethnicities, such as Ashkenazi Jews and Italians in New York City and Polish-Americans and other Eastern Europeans in Chicago. In New York City, Tammany Hall was the dominant political machine that controlled political patronage positions and nominations, and figures like Carmine DeSapio were powerful kingmakers on a national level. However, many left the Democratic Party as it has moved leftward since the late 1960s, and they became a key component of the socially conservative Reagan Democrats during the 1980s.

With increased suburbanization and the continued assimilation of white ethnics and their subsequent replacement by newer immigrant groups, many of the remaining white ethnics have lost much of their political power in urban politics in the early 21st century.

See also

 Ethnic origin
 Hyphenated American
 Symbolic ethnicity
 Other White, a census designation used in the United Kingdom
 Mediterranean race
 Albanian Americans
 Armenian Americans
 Bulgarian Americans
 Croatian Americans
 Czech Americans
 French Americans
 German Americans
 Greek Americans
 Turkish Americans
 Hungarian Americans
 Irish Americans
 Italian Americans
 Jewish Americans
 Lithuanian Americans
 Polish Americans
 Portuguese Americans
 Romanian Americans
 Russian Americans
 Serbian Americans
 Spanish Americans
 Ukrainian Americans

References

Albanian-American culture
Armenian-American culture
Belarusian-American culture
Catholicism in the United States
Croatian-American culture
Czech-American culture
Eastern Europeans in the United States
Eastern Orthodoxy in the United States
Catholic Church in the United States
European-American society
French-American culture
Georgian-American culture
Greek-American culture
Greek-American history
History of immigration to the United States
Hungarian-American culture
Italian-American culture
Italian-American history
Irish-American culture
Irish-American history
Jews and Judaism in the United States
Lithuanian-American culture
Polish-American culture
Portuguese-American culture
Romanian-American culture
Russian-American culture
Serbian-American culture
Spanish-American culture
Slavic-American society
Ukrainian-American culture
White American culture
White Americans
Working-class culture in the United States